Reason and Revolution: Hegel and the Rise of Social Theory (1941; second edition 1954) is a book by the philosopher Herbert Marcuse, in which the author discusses the social theories of the philosophers Georg Wilhelm Friedrich Hegel and Karl Marx. Marcuse reinterprets Hegel, with the aim of demonstrating that Hegel's basic concepts are hostile to the tendencies that led to fascism.

The book has received praise as an important discussion of Hegel and Marx.

Summary

Marcuse attempts to show that "Hegel's basic concepts are hostile to the tendencies that have led into Fascist theory and practice." Marcuse criticizes the thesis, propounded by the sociologist Leonard Hobhouse in The Metaphysical Theory of the State (1918), that Hegel provided an ideological preparation for German authoritarianism. In an appendix to the 1960 edition, Marcuse states that the "only major recent development in the interpretation of Hegel's philosophy is the postwar revival of Hegel studies in France." Marcuse credits the new French interpretation with showing clearly the "inner connection between the idealistic and materialistic dialectic". He provides a list of key works, including the philosopher Alexandre Kojève's Introduction to the Reading of Hegel (1947).

Publication history
Reason and Revolution was first published by Oxford University Press in 1941. A second edition was published by Humanities Press, Inc., in 1954. In 1960, the book was published in a paperback edition by Beacon Press.

Reception
The psychoanalyst Erich Fromm praised Reason and Revolution, calling it "brilliant and penetrating" and "the most important work which has opened up an understanding of Marx's humanism". The historian Peter Gay described the book as one of the most important discussions of alienation in the scholarly literature on Hegel and Marx. Jean-Michel Palmier saw the work as a rejection of Marcuse's Hegel's Ontology and the Theory of Historicity (1932), an interpretation of Hegel influenced by Martin Heidegger.

References

Bibliography
Books

External links
 marxists.org - the book
 marcuse.org listing with full texts of 19 reviews and links to on-line excerpts

1941 non-fiction books
Books about Georg Wilhelm Friedrich Hegel
Books about Karl Marx
Books about revolutions
Books about Marxism
English-language books
Oxford University Press books
Works by Herbert Marcuse